Cham-e Dehqan (also Romanized as Cham-e Dehqān) is a village in Howmeh-ye Sharqi Rural District, in the Central District of Ramhormoz County, Khuzestan Province, Iran. At the 2006 census, its population was 16, in 4 families.

References 

Populated places in Ramhormoz County